Michael Glasder (born 27 March 1989) is an American ski jumper.

World Cup

Standings

Individual starts (25)

References

External links 

1989 births
Living people
American male ski jumpers
Olympic ski jumpers of the United States
Ski jumpers at the 2018 Winter Olympics
People from Lake Forest, Illinois